The Soling Competition at the 1992 Summer Olympics was held from 27 July to 4 August 1992 in Barcelona, Spain. The competition was for the first time in a combined format. First the competitors had to sail a series of six fleet races. Points were awarded for placement in each race. The best five out of six race scores counted for placement in the match race series. After the fleetraces the top 6 placed boats sailed a round-robin series of match races. After the round-robin the best four proceeded to the semi-finals. Here the boat placed 1st met the boat placed 4th and the boat placed 2nd met the boat placed 3rd in a best out of three series of match races. Finally the winners of the semi-finals met in the final best out of three match races. The losers of the semi-finals also met in a best out of three series of matches for the bronze medal.

Results

Results after Fleetrace

DNF = Did Not Finish, DSQ = Disqualified, PMS = Premature Start
Crossed out results did not count for the total result.
 = Male,  = Female

Results after Matchracing

Round Robin

Finals (best of 3)

Daily standings

Notes

References 
 
 
 
 
 

 

Soling
Olympic Soling Regattas